Mirsad Hibić (born 11 October 1973) is a Bosnian retired professional footballer who played as a centre-back.

Club career
At club level, he played for NK Čelik Zenica, Hajduk Split, Sevilla FC, and Atlético Madrid, before retiring in January 2004.

International career
  
Hibić made his debut for Bosnia and Herzegovina in an April 1996 friendly match against Albania and has earned a total of 36 caps (14 as captain), scoring no goals. His final international was an April 2004 friendly against Finland.

Personal life
Hibić resides in Zenica with his family.

References

External links 
 
 

1973 births
Living people
Sportspeople from Zenica
Association football central defenders
Yugoslav footballers
Bosnia and Herzegovina footballers
Bosnia and Herzegovina international footballers
NK Čelik Zenica players
HNK Hajduk Split players
Sevilla FC players
Atlético Madrid footballers
Yugoslav Second League players
Croatian Football League players
La Liga players
Segunda División players
Bosnia and Herzegovina expatriate footballers
Expatriate footballers in Croatia
Bosnia and Herzegovina expatriate sportspeople in Croatia
Expatriate footballers in Spain
Bosnia and Herzegovina expatriate sportspeople in Spain
Bosniaks of Bosnia and Herzegovina